Jaalam may refer to:

 Jaalam Research, a Canadian network software company renamed AppNeta
Jaalam (name), a biblical Hebrew male given name